List of people with surname Schilizzi:
 Alexandra Helen Schilizzi (1904–1988), British lecturer and politician
 Demetrius Stefanovich Schilizzi (1839–1893), Greek banker and Italian consul
 Helena Schilizzi (1873–1959), British philanthropist

See also 
 Mausoleo Schilizzi, mausoleum built in the 1880s, commissioned by banker Matteo Schilizzi